Björn Schierenbeck (born 12 July 1974) is a German former professional footballer who played as a defender or midfielder.

Career
Born in Bremen, Schierenbeck made his debut on the professional league level on 22 February 1996 in the Bundesliga for SV Werder Bremen coming on as a 90th-minute substitute for Christian Brand in a game against Hansa Rostock.

Honours
 DFB-Pokal: 1999

External links

Living people
1974 births
Footballers from Bremen
Association football defenders
Association football midfielders
German footballers
SV Werder Bremen players
SV Werder Bremen II players
SpVgg Greuther Fürth players
Bundesliga players
2. Bundesliga players